Krishnapuram is a village in the Virudhunagar district in the state of Tamil Nadu, India. It is located in the Kollam - Tirumangalam Road National Highways 744 and is about 7 km from Rajapalayam.

Agriculture
Agriculture is the main occupation of the Krishnapuram people. Krishnapuram is bounded by farmlands and crop fields in all the direction. Most of the farming includes coconut, paddy rice, mango, sugarcane, cotton, millet, roots and tuber crops, maize, cucumber, pumpkin and numerous fresh vegetable. There are no mango farms in Krishnapuram. Most of the farms are seen in the outskirts of the village and nearby Ayyanar Koil Forest Area or Western Ghats. As the mango farming is a seasonal one, most of the village farmers are busy in cultivating mango during the summer season. And the ripened mangoes are quite famous around the Krishnapuram locales.

Most of the irrigation processes are carried out in traditional ways. The sources of the irrigation water are mostly wells and in some cases surface water are being pumped into the farmlands.

Politics
Krishnapuram comes under Rajapalayam (State Assembly Constituency) and Tenkasi (Lok Sabha constituency) which is incumbent by Thanga Pandiyan (DMK) and Dhanush M. Kumar	 (DMK) respectively.

References

External links

Villages in Virudhunagar district